Squaw weed, squaw-weed or squawweed is a common name for several plants in the family Asteraceae native to North America and may refer to:

Eupatorium rugosum
Packera aurea
Senecio ampullaceus 
Senecio flaccidus
Senecio obovatus
Senecio vulgaris
Symphyotrichum puniceum